The men's individual revolver and pistol competition was one of 15 shooting sports events on the shooting at the 1908 Summer Olympics programme. The competition was held on Friday, 10 July 1908. Each nation could enter up to 12 shooters. Forty-three sport shooters from seven nations competed. Nations were limited to 12 shooters each. The event was won by Paul Van Asbroeck of Belgium, with his countryman Réginald Storms taking silver. They were the first medals for Belgian shooters in the free pistol. American James Gorman finished with the bronze medal after an unsuccessful protest, claiming he had put one bullet through a previous hole.

Background

This was the third appearance of what would become standardised as the men's ISSF 50 meter pistol event. The event was held at every Summer Olympics from 1896 to 1920 (except 1904, when no shooting events were held) and from 1936 to 2016; it was open to women from 1968 to 1980. 1896 and 1908 were the only Games in which the distance was not 50 metres; the former used 30 metres and the latter 50 yards.

Great Britain and Sweden each made their debut in the event. Belgium, France, Greece, the Netherlands, and the United States each made their second appearance, tied for most of any nation.

Van Asbroeck used a Sauveur HS-6.

Competition format

The competition had each shooter fire 60 shots, in 10 series of 6 shots each, at a distance of 50 yards. The target was round, 50 centimetres in diameter, with 10 scoring rings. Scoring for each shot was up to 10 points, in increments of 1 point. The maximum score possible was 600 points. Any revolver or pistol could be used; only open sights were allowed. Any ammunition with a metal cartridge case could be used.

Records

Prior to this competition, the existing world and Olympic records were as follows.

Schedule

Results

Sixty shots were fired at a distance of 50 yards. Each hit counted between 1 and 10 points, for a total maximum score of 600.

References

Sources
 
 

Men's pistol individual free
Men's 1908